The Pesa Atribo is an articulated diesel multiple unit for regional train services made by Pesa SA of Poland.

Description
The Atribo is a development of the earlier Pesa 218M. It features a low floor and is designed for regional, non-electrified lines. The train features two toilets, one of which is accessible to disabled people. The trains can operate with up to three sets in multiple. The Italian version has 21 seats in first class (in the 2 + 1) and 129 fixed and 4 tip-up seats in the 2nd class. The Polish version is second class only having 150 fixed seats and 7 tip-up seats. Atribo is equipped with visual and acoustic passenger information system.

Trenitalia sets have a Voith engine, producing less noise and lower emissions.

Usage

Ferrovie del Sud Est
The contract with the Ferrovie del Sud Est for the delivery of 13 Atribo sets was signed on June 12, 2006. On February 26, 2007, FSE using the options included in the signed contract, expanded the order to 23 units. Deliveries began on July 15, 2008. In March 2010, signed a new contract for the next 4 sets.

FSE uses its Pesa Atribo's in the region of Apulia. They operate services around Bari, Martina Franca, Taranto and Lecce.

From 2019, and until 2022, they were subject to a revision through the application of the DPR livery and interior arrangement, following the Trenitalia schemes.

Ferrovie Nord Milano
FNM ordered two Pesa Atribo sets on February 17, 2009. They were handed over to the operator on April 9, 2009, in Brescia. The trains are allocated to operate the route Brescia - Iseo - Edolo.

Ferrovie Emilia Romagna / Trasporto Emilia-Romagna Passeggeri
On May 19, 2009, a contract was signed with the Ferrovie Emilia Romagna for eight Atribo sets  to operate on the  Bologna - Portomaggiore and Casalecchio - Vignola lines. The first three sets were delivered on June 25, 2009. Later, an agreement was signed for the delivery of four additional units.

West Pomeranian Voivodeship
The region signed an agreement on January 29, 2010, for the purchase of 10 Atribo sets with the option of adding another two units, of which the options were taken up in September 2010. The first two units were delivered on June 25, and June 27, 2010, and started their operation in the West Pomeranian Regional Transport Department. Further units were delivered at a rate of one or two a month until January 28, 2011.

Vehicles are assigned to the depot in Kolobrzeg. Trains were allocated primarily to operate the Szczecin - Kolobrzeg (- Koszalin) and Szczecin - Szczecinek services. Vehicles occasionally operate the Koszalin - Mielno Koszalin route, supported mainly by Class SA103 and Slawno - Darlowo supported mainly by Classes SA109 and SA110. In case of failure of Western Pomeranian Class EN57, Atribo sets replace them on the electrified routes such as Szczecin - Białogard, Szczecin - Gryfino and Szczecin - Kamien Pomorski. Since August 29, 2012 Atribo are also used on the line Szczecin - Piła and since June 2013 also to Szczecin Airport Goleniów (on the route from Szczecin to Kolobrzeg).

Trenitalia
On 12 December 2013 Pesa a contract signed in Rome with Trenitalia for the supply of 40 Atribo sets with the option to purchase an additional 20. Transfer of the first unit for the Italian national carrier took place in November 2014 and the end of the supply is scheduled for July 2015. At the end of July 2014, the first vehicle was tested on an experimental track Railway Institute near Żmigród, and it was delivered on August 20 to Pisa and allocated to the tests necessary to release these vehicles to move around on the Italian railway network. On December 4, 2014, the official presentation of the unit was held at Roma Termini.

Units were purchased to replace older units with the aim to replace old ALn 668 series and ALn 663, and operate in the regions of Tuscany, Abruzzo, Calabria, Marche and Veneto. The units are known by Trenitalia as Swing. As at December 2015 32 of the 40 units have been delivered.

Pomeranian Voivodeship
On September 2, 2014, the Pomeranian government signed a contract for the supply from Pesa of 7 Atribo sets and 2 Pesa 218Mc sets operate on the Pomeranian Metropolitan Railway. The trains entered service with the inauguration of the metropolitan railway on 1 September 2015.

See also 
 Pesa SA

References

External links 

 Official Pesa website

This article is based upon a translation of the Polish language version as at February 2015.

PESA SA
Articulated passenger trains
Diesel railcars and multiple units of Italy
Diesel multiple units of Poland
FS Class ATR 220